HSBC Continental Europe (formerly HSBC France SA) is a subsidiary of HSBC, headquartered in the 8th arrondissement of Paris.

History 

It was formed on 1 November 2005 when HSBC rebranded CCF S.A. (Crédit Commercial de France), together with its subsidiaries UBP, Banque de Picardie and Banque Hervet. HSBC had acquired CCF in 2000; the bank changed its name to HSBC S.A. and then to HSBC France.

About half of the former networks of CCF - Union de Banques à Paris, Banque Hervet, Banque de Picardie and Banque de Baecque Beau - now trade as HSBC. This represents a 380 strong network of branches in France with a very strong presence in the Paris region.

Other group operations in France include a significant HSBC Private Bank presence, along with a major Corporate Institutional Banking and Markets operation. The Paris trading floor is the Group's second-largest trading floor in Europe. Specific areas of particular expertise and responsibility are the trading of government bonds and euro interest rate derivatives, arranging of corporate cash calls, disintermediated and structured finance and project finance.

HSBC France had seven regional subsidiaries with 420 branches, but sold them to Banque Populaire in 2008. These regional subsidiaries were Société Marseillaise de Crédit, Banque de Savoie, Banque Chaix, Banque Marze, Banque Dupuy, Banque de Parseval, Banque Pelletier and Crédit Commercial du Sud Ouest.

In December 2020, HSBC France rebranded to "HSBC Continental Europe" along with all HSBC European branches (Belgium, Spain, Greece, Ireland, Italy, Luxembourg, the Netherlands, Poland, Czechia and Sweden). The move was expected to create "a modernized universal banking model" and provide "a new momentum to its European operations".

In March 2021 it was reported that HSBC France was in talks to sell its retail division to Cerberus Capital Management.

CCF joins the HSBC Group
When HSBC acquired CCF, CCF was operating with 650 branches and assets of €69 billion. In April 2000, HSBC Holdings plc announced its intention to acquire the bank and completed the deal in July. That month, HSBC Holdings plc listed on the Paris Stock Exchange for the first time. The acquisition enabled HSBC to establish itself in one of the main European markets and to build a strong platform in the euro zone. CCF continued to expand with the purchase of Banque Pelletier (2000) and Banque Hervet (2001). CCF won a bidding-war for Banque Hervet, which the French government was re-privatizing, when its bid of $480 million beat out bids from Paribas, Credit du Nord - Dexia, and insurer Groupama.

With the acquisition of CCF, HSBC acquired CCF's stake in Lombard Bank in Malta. At the time, HSBC already owned the largest bank in Malta. In 2002, HSBC sold its shares in Lombard Bank Malta to Swiss-based Banca Unione di Credito.

CCF also sold its 93.3 per cent stake in Crédit International d’Egypte (CIE), an Egyptian commercial bank listed on the Cairo Stock Exchange, to Crédit Agricole Indosuez (75%) and the El Mansour and El Maghraby groups (25%).  HSBC was already operating in Egypt through HSBC Bank Egypt.

In 2002, CCF acquired 11 branches outside Paris from Banque Worms/Deutsche Bank.

Check Fee Collusion
In 2010 the French government's Autorité de la concurrence (the department in charge of regulating competition) fined eleven French banks, including HSBC France, the sum of 384,900,000 Euros for colluding to charge unjustified fees on check processing, especially for extra fees charged during the transition from paper check transfer to "Exchanges Check-Image" electronic transfer.

See also

HSBC Holdings plc
HSBC Bank plc

References

External links
 HSBC France website
 HSBC France bank profile (in English)

Banks based in Paris
France
Banks under direct supervision of the European Central Bank
2000 mergers and acquisitions
Banks of France